Harbor Point may refer to:

 Harbor Point (skyscraper), a skyscraper in Chicago, Illinois
 Harbor Point, alternate name of Columbia Point (Boston) in the Boston Harbor
 Harbor Point, Baltimore, an expansion south and east of the Inner Harbor East, Baltimore re-development in Maryland
 Harbor Point, California
 Harbor Point, Michigan
 Harbor Point, Stamford, Connecticut
 Harbor Point, Subic, a shopping mall in Olongapo City, Philippines